The Morarji Desai National Institute of Yoga (acronym MDNIY) is an autonomous organisation under the Ministry of Ayush, Government of India. It is the nodal agency for Planning, Training, Promotion and Coordination of Yoga Education, Training, Therapy and Research.

Profile 

The Morarji Desai National Institute of Yoga is a Government of India initiative with a mandate to promote the yoga culture and spread the yoga philosophy nationwide. The functioning of the Institute is under the Ministry of Ayush. The Institute is mandated to promote Yoga philosophy and facilitate training and advanced research on the subject. MDNIY has been organizing Yoga Mahotsav annually since 2016. Yoga Mahotsav is a curtain raiser for International Day of Yoga to sensitize the masses regarding celebration of IDY.

Common Yoga Protocol and Yoga DVD for International Day of Yoga, celebrated on June 21, were prepared by the Institute in consultation with the eminent Yoga Experts and the officials of various Ministries, Govt. of India.

The Institute was started in 1970, in the form a hospital, opened by the now defunct Central Council for Research in Indian Systems of Medicine and Homeopathy, under the Vishwayatan Yogashram. The hospital was later converted into an institute, by name, Central Research Institute for Yoga (CRIY) in 1976, to provide free training to people and to organize research on yoga. In 1988, the institute was further renamed as the Morarji Desai National Institute of Yoga with expanded mandates.

Facilities
The Institute is housed in a campus measuring 2.818 acres, and is equipped with the amenities such as a conference hall with audio visual facilities accommodating 50 people, an auditorium with a capacity of 140 people, a library with a collection of over 9000 books on yoga and related topics, a practice hall (Kriya block) for 30 people, an academic block for classes and practices, an out-patient facility where therapists, dietitians and medical officers offer consultancy services, a laboratory with physiological and biochemical testing and research facilities, an x-ray unit and a multi media centre with audio-visual support.

Departments
Teaching Department: The faculty of MDNIY is further classified into eight sub sections, each catering to a specific branch of study such as Yoga Education, Yoga Therapy, Yoga Philosophy, Yoga and Human Consciousness, Anatomy, Physiology, Allied Sciences and Languages. The department of Allied sciences focusses on alternative medicine systems such as Ayurveda and Naturopathy as well as clinical 
support functions of Dietetics & Nutrition, Hospital Management and Computer Science. The Department of Languages is a teaching centre for Sanskrit, English and Hindi languages.

Yoga Education Department: The Institute offers three themes of yoga education, Diploma in Yoga Science, Certificate Course in Yoga Science for Target Group and Continuing Medical Education programme on Yoga

Courses

MDNIY conducts several courses for the general public as well as yoga trainers.
 Yoga Training Programs
 Yoga Education
 Special Programme
 Scientific Research
 Publication and Propagation
 International Activities
 Extension Activities

It also facilitates advanced research on yoga.

Yoga therapy centres
The Institute manages four yoga training centers in the state of Delhi.

 Yoga Therapy Centre, Vallabhbhai Patel Chest Institute, University of Delhi, North Campus, Delhi – 110 007
 Rajan Babu Institute of Pulmonary Medicine and Tuberculosis, Dhaka Colony, Kingsway Camp, Delhi – 110 009
 LRS Institute of Tuberculosis and Respiratory Diseases, Sri Aurobindo Marg, Mehrauli, New Delhi – 110 030.
 Institute of Human Behavior and Allied Sciences, Jhilmil, Dilshad Garden, Delhi – 110 095

In addition to these centers, MDNIY also assists NGOs and other agencies in setting up nodal centers at various parts of the country.

Publications

MDNIY has published several books on yoga as well as taken up many publications of other yoga centres for distribution.

 Yogic Management of Arthritis
 Yogic  of Respiratory Disorders
 Yogic Management of Gynecological Disorders
 Yogic Management of Geriatric Disorders
 Yogic Management of Neurological Disorders
 Yogic Management of Psychiatric Disorders
 Yoga Training Manual for School Children
 Bi-Monthly Lecture Series
 Yoga for Common Disorders
 Yoga for Wellness by The Yoga Institute, Santacruz, Mumbai
 Yoga for Wellness by Kaivalyadhama, Lonavla, Pune
 Yoga for Wellness by Ramamani Iyengar Memorial Yoga Institute, Pune
 Yoga for Wellness by Krishnamacharya Yoga Mandiram, Chennai
 Yoga for Wellness by Isha Yoga Foundation, Coimbatore
 Yoga for Wellness by International Centre for Yoga Education and Research (ICYER), Puducherry
 Yoga for Wellness by Swami Rama Sadhak Gram, Rishikesh
 Yoga for Holistic Personality Development by Ramamani Iyengar Memorial Yoga Institute, Pune
 Yoga for Holistic Personality Development by The Yoga Institute, Santacruze (East), Mumbai
 Yoga for Holistic Personality Development by Kaivalyadhama S.M.Y.M. Samiti, Lonavala, Pune
 Yoga for Holistic Personality Development by SVYAM University, Bangalore
 A Yogic approach to Holistic Personality Development By Yoganjali Natyalayam, Puduchery
 Understanding and Development of our Personality by Prof. C. G. Deshpande, Pune
 Yoga Calendars on 10 topics ((CD)  Hindi and English)
 Yoga for All (CD) (English & Hindi)
 Yoga for Women (CD) (English & Hindi)

The Institute publishes a quarterly journal, Yoga Vijnana (Science of Yoga) where articles written by experts and authorities of yoga and other relevant information are published.

See also

 Yoga physiology
 List of asanas
 List of yoga schools
 Yoga series

References

External links
 on Government of India portal
 on Open Government Data platform of India
 on YouTube
 on Wikimapia

Ministry of AYUSH
Yoga organizations
Yoga schools
Ministry of Health and Family Welfare
Morarji Desai